Elvis is a male given name. It is an anglicisation of the Irish name of Saint Ailbe (d. 528). 
The saint was also a popular figure in medieval Wales, where he was claimed to be of British origin,
in which case the Irish name Ailbe might be  gaelicisation of an Ancient British name ancestral to modern Welsh Eilfyw or Eilfw.

Etymology

The etymology of the name is unknown, and it is uncertain whether the name should be considered Irish (Gaelic) or British (Welsh) or Scandinavian (Old Norse) in origin. 
A folk etymology is suggested in the Vita Albei, as a derivative of   ail "a rock" and beo "living".  
A sporadic association of the saint's name with rocks has been observed, as in the Lia Ailbe ("stone of Ailbe") on the Magh Ailbe (plain of Ailbe),  in  Sliabh Ailbe "Mount Ailbe"  in Duanaire Finn. and maybe in Inbher Ailbhine   mentioned in Tirechan's Vita Patricii. 
Other possibilities involve derivation from the root albh- "white", which is found in the names of a number of Celtic deities (including a possible Albius recorded in a single inscription from Aignay-le Duc),
or alternively from Insular Celtic  albi(i̭)o- "world" (Welsh   elfydd "world, land", or alternatively from the surname Elwes.

The name may be derived from the Scandinavian Old Norse word Alvis which in Norse mythology means “all-wise”.

The name may be related or identical to Elwen, Elvan, the name of a poorly attested saint or saints venerated in early medieval Cornwall and Brittany.

In medieval French sources, the unrelated homograph Elvis occurs as a feminine name, a variant of Helvis, Aluysa, Alaisa, from a Germanic name such as Alwis.

Usage
The name most commonly refers to American singer and actor Elvis Presley (1935–1977).
Earlier bearers of the name include American college administrator Elvis Jacob Stahr, Jr. (1916–1998, born the same year as Elvis Presley's father, Vernon Elvis Presley). In most cases, however, it refers to people who have the name as a tribute to Elvis Presley. People in this latter group includes those who took the name themselves (with UK-born singer and songwriter Elvis Costello being an example), and those who were named Elvis by their parents.

People with the name

Musicians

Elvis Presley (1935–1977), American singer and actor, known simply as Elvis, also known as “The King of Rock and Roll”, or simply “The King”
Elvis Perkins (born 1976), American singer and songwriter
Elvis Costello (born 1954), the stage name of Declan Patrick MacManus, English singer
Elvis Blue (born 1979), the stage name of South African Idol's season 6 winner Jan Hoogendyk
Elvis Hitler, the stage name of Jim Leedy, an American singer and the frontman of the band Elvis Hitler
Elvis Crespo (born 1971), Puerto Rican Merengue singer
Elvis Francois (born 1985), American orthopedic surgeon and singer
Elvis Maswanganyi (born c. 1985), South African DJ, better known as DJ Mujava

Sports
Elvis Peacock (born 1956), American gridiron football running back
Elvis Perrodin (1956–2012) American jockey
Elvis Rolle (born 1958), Bahamian basketball player
Elvis Patterson (born 1960) American gridiron football defensive back
Elvis Brajković (born 1969), Croatian retired footballer
Elvis Martínez (footballer) (born 1970), Venezuelan football defender
Elvis Grbac (born 1970), American gridiron football quarterback
Elvis Fatović (born 1971), Croatian water polo player
Elvis Gregory (born 1971), Cuban fencer
Elvis Scoria (born 1971), Croatian football manager and former player
Elvis Sinosic (born 1971), Australian mixed martial artist
Elvis Stojko (born 1972), Canadian figure skater
Elvis Mihailenko (born 1976), Latvian boxer 
Elvis Mešić (born 1977), Bosnian footballer
Elvis Scott (born 1978), Hondurean footballer
Elvis Vermeulen (born 1979), French rugby player
Elvis Hammond (born 1980), Ghanaian footballer player 
Elvis Marecos (born 1980), Paraguayan footballer
Elvis Abbruscato, (born 1981), Italian footballer
Elvis Trujillo (born 1983) American jockey
Elvis Dumervil (born 1984), American former gridiron football defensive end
Elvis Andrus (born 1988), Venezuelan baseball player
Elvis Vieira Araújo (born 1990), Brazilian footballer
Elvis Manu (born 1993), Ghanaian footballer
Elvis Merzļikins (born 1994), Latvian ice hockey player
Elvis Kamsoba (born 1996), Burundian footballer
Elvis Mendes (born 1997), Cape Verdean footballer
Elvis Peguero (born 1997),  Dominican baseball pitcher
Elvis Álvarez (1965–1995), Colombian boxer

Other
Elvis Jacob Stahr Jr. (1916–1998), American administrator and government official 
Elvis Mitchell (born 1958), American film critic, formerly with The New York Times
Elvis Duran (born 1964), host of Elvis Duran and the Morning Show

Fictional characters

Elvis, a pet alligator in Miami Vice
Elvis Cole, private investigator and protagonist of the Robert Crais series of crime novels
Elvis Cridlington, a firefighter in Fireman Sam
Elvis "EJ" DiMera, a character on the American soap opera Days of Our Lives
Elvis, a character in Perfect Dark
Elvis, a character in God Hand
Elvis, a guide dog in Growing Up Fisher

References

Masculine given names
Irish masculine given names
English masculine given names